There are many Grade I listed buildings in Babergh, a non-metropolitan district of in the county of Suffolk in England.

In the United Kingdom, the term listed building refers to a building or other structure officially designated as being of "exceptional architectural or historic special interest"; Grade I structures are those considered to be "buildings of "exceptional interest, sometimes considered to be internationally important. Just 2.5% of listed buildings are Grade I." The total number of listed buildings in England is 372,905. Listing was begun by a provision in the Town and Country Planning Act 1947. Listing a building imposes severe restrictions on what the owner might wish to change or modify in the structure or its fittings. In England, the authority for listing under the Planning (Listed Buildings and Conservation Areas) Act 1990 rests with English Heritage, a non-departmental public body sponsored by the Department for Culture, Media and Sport.

Babergh is a local government district with its administrative headquarters at Ipswich (outside the district, previously being Hadleigh), while the main town in the district is Sudbury. The number of inhabitants of the area is 86,700 with a density of 146 inhabitants per km2. The whole district is parished and divided among 76 civil parishes, of which only 21 in 2006 had a population over 1,000 inhabitants and 18 were provided with key facilities.

The district is well known due to its natural environment as "Constable Country" after the landscapes painted by John Constable in the Area of Outstanding Natural Beauty of Dedham Vale; it is famed also for the medieval wool villages of Lavenham and Kersey. Summing up Babergh has in its territory 4,000 listed buildings, 34 scheduled monuments, 5 registered Parks and Gardens of Special Historic Interest, 28 conservation areas, 53 Sites of Special Scientific Interest and 231 County Wildlife Sites.

List

|}

See also
Grade II* listed buildings in Babergh
List of Grade I listed buildings in Suffolk

Notes

References

External links

Babergh